The following is a list of prime ministers of South Korea from the First Republic to the Sixth Republic.

List of prime ministers

Timeline

See also
 Deputy Prime Minister of South Korea
 List of presidents of South Korea
 List of prime ministers of Korea

External links
 Former Prime Ministers

South Korea
Government of South Korea

Prime ministers